The Portland Chinatown Museum is a museum showcasing the Chinese immigrant experience, located in Portland, Oregon's Old Town Chinatown neighborhood, in the United States. The museum opened in 2018, with Jackie Peterson-Loomis serving as the executive director. Anna Truxes is the current executive director.

See also
 History of Chinese Americans in Portland, Oregon
 List of museums in Portland, Oregon

References

External links
 

2018 establishments in Oregon
Chinese-American culture in Portland, Oregon
Museums established in 2018
Museums in Portland, Oregon
Northwest Portland, Oregon
Old Town Chinatown